A rib chop comes from the rib section of an animal, usually the term is used for pork and lamb. Rib chops are considered the ribeye of pork and lamb.

Pork 
Rib chops from a pig are cut from the loin, or the back of the pig.  A rib chop has a thin layer of fat around the outside. Since it is center cut, it contains little connective tissue, which makes it good for fast, dry heat methods, such as grilling and panbroiling. Unlike the loin chop, a rib chop is almost one muscle, which makes it cook more evenly.

Lamb 
Like on a pig, rib chops from a lamb that has a layer of fat, two actually. If the whole primal cut is left intact, it becomes a rack of lamb. Again, they have little connective tissue, so they are usually roasted as a rack, or grilled one by one.

References

See also 
Meat chop

Cuts of meat